Aplysia kurodai is a species of gastropods belonging to the family Aplysiidae.

The species is found in Japan and Southeastern Asia.

References

kurodai
Gastropods of Asia
Gastropods described in 1937